NGC 313 is a triple star located in the constellation Pisces. It was discovered on November 29, 1850 by Bindon Stoney.

References

External links
 

0313
18501129
Pisces (constellation)